The 2017 Hungarian Challenger Open is a professional tennis tournament played on indoor hard courts. It is the second edition of the tournament and is a part of the 2017 ATP Challenger Tour. It takes place in Budapest, Hungary between 6 and 12 February 2017.

Singles main-draw entrants

Seeds

 1 Rankings are as of January 30, 2017.

Other entrants
The following players received wildcards into the singles main draw:
  Attila Balázs 
  Gábor Borsos
  Zsombor Piros
  Máté Valkusz

The following player received entry into the singles main draw using a protected ranking:
  Jürgen Melzer

The following players received entry from the qualifying draw:
  Matthias Bachinger
  Yannick Hanfmann
  Michał Przysiężny
  Alexey Vatutin

The following players received entry as lucky losers:
  Andrea Arnaboldi
  Edward Corrie
  Gianluigi Quinzi

Champions

Singles

 Jürgen Melzer def.  Márton Fucsovics 7–6(8–6), 6–2.

Doubles

 Dino Marcan /  Tristan-Samuel Weissborn def.  Blaž Kavčič /  Franko Škugor 6–3, 3–6, [16–14].

External links
 Official website

Hungarian Challenger Open
2017 in Hungarian tennis